The Master of the Nets Garden in Suzhou is among the finest gardens in China. It is recognized with the other Classical Gardens of Suzhou as a UNESCO World Heritage Site. The garden demonstrates Chinese garden designers' adept skills for synthesizing art, nature, and architecture to create unique metaphysical masterpieces. The Master of the Nets is particularly regarded among garden connoisseurs for its mastering the techniques of relative dimension, contrast, foil, sequence and depth, and borrowed scenery.

History
The Master of the Nets garden, then called Ten Thousand Volume Hall, was first constructed in 1140 by Shi Zhengzhi, the Deputy Civil Service Minister of the Southern Song dynasty government. Shi Zhengzhi was inspired by the simple and solitary life of a Chinese fisherman depicted in philosophical writings. After his death, the garden passed through numerous ownership and subsequently fell into disarray until around 1785 when it was restored by Song Zongyuan, a retired government official of the Qing dynasty. He drastically redesigned the garden and added multiple buildings, but retained the spirit of the site. He often referred to himself as a fisherman and renamed it the Master of the Nets Garden, as an allusion to the simple life of a fisherman.

Ownership passed to Qu Yuancun, a scholar well-versed in the classics and literature, in 1795. He added and remodelled buildings, planted trees, and arranged stones. The garden acquired the nickname of Qu's Garden during this period as well as its first acclaim by critics. Ownership passed to Li Hongyi, an imperial official and master calligrapher in 1868. About half of the steles in the garden are inscribed by him. Ownership passed to He Chang in 1940, who restored both the garden and returned the name back to Master of Nets Garden. He stipulated in his will the garden should be donated to the government. In 1958, his daughter He Zehui gave the garden to the Suzhou government.

During the late 18th century, it was recognized for its herbaceous peonies. In his Notes on the Master of Nets Garden, Qian Daxin stated, "A good integration of the delights of the village and town." Modern critic Chen Congzhou feels that the Master of the Nets Garden is the best representation of all classical Chinese garden art, as stated in Famous Classical Gardens of China.

Design

The 5,400 m2 garden is divided into east and west sections. The eastern part consists of residential quarters, while the gardens are located in the western part. Eastern section is the residential area it is a linear sequence of four halls one tower and three courtyards. The western garden is an ensemble of buildings around the 334 m2 Rosy Cloud Pool. Plants and rocks are used to create views that represent several seasons. It also includes three side courts to the east and south. The two dominant elements of the composition are the Barrier of Cloud grotto, a cypress tree dating from the Ming dynasty, and pine several centuries old. The areas to the south of the Rosy Cloud Pool were used for social activities and the areas to the north were used for intellectual activities. The buildings are laid out in a style called close to the water which is used to give the Rosy Clouds Pool the illusion of great size. Small buildings are set on rocks or piers directly over the water surface while large buildings are separated from the pool by yards planted with trees to obscure their size.

See also
Astor Court (inspired by the Master of the Nets Garden)
Chinese garden

Notes

References

External links

Classical Gardens of Suzhou
AAAA-rated tourist attractions
Major National Historical and Cultural Sites in Jiangsu